Encelia densifolia is a species of perennial shrub in the sunflower family commonly known as the Vizcaino encelia. This species is endemic to the Vizcaino Peninsula of Baja California Sur, Mexico.

Description 
multi−branched perennial shrub, reaching  in height. The branches are lined with dentate, triangular leaves a few centimeters long, that are light green, hairless and smooth in texture.

The inflorescence is a solitary daisylike flower head  in diameter, on a short, leaved peduncle. The head has a center of many yellow disc florets surrounded by up to 12 yellow ray florets. The involucre consists of canescent, obtuse phyllaries. It blooms in spring.

The fruit is an achene about half a centimeter long, usually lacking a pappus. The fruits have ciliate margins

Distribution
The plant is native to Baja California Sur, México, where it is known only from one small, remote arroyo in the Sierra Santa Clara on the Vizcaino Peninsula.

References

External links
Encelia densifolia — U.C. CalPhoto gallery

densiflora
Flora of Baja California Sur
Natural history of the Peninsular Ranges
Drought-tolerant plants